Kimaris, also known by the alternate names Cimeies, Cimejes and Cimeries, is most widely known as the 66th demon of the first part of the Lemegeton (popularly known as the Ars Goetia).

Description

He is described in the Lemegeton as a godly warrior riding a black horse, and possesses the abilities of locating lost or hidden treasures, teaching trivium (grammar, logic and rhetoric) and making a man into a warrior of his own likeness.  He holds the rank of marquis, and is served by 20 legions.  Much the same description is found in the earlier text of Johann Weyer's catalog of demons, Pseudomonarchia Daemonum (published 1563). Earlier still is the Munich Handbook of Necromancy (Clm 849) which lists an entity named Tuvries with much the same characteristics, except that he has 30 legions of servitors, and can cause a person to cross seas and rivers quickly.

Other mentions

Kimaris, as Cimeries, is also found on Anton LaVey's list of infernal names, although it is not known why LaVey chose Kimaris as one of the comparatively few Goetic daimons included.  Aleister Crowley, in 777, gives Kimaris the Hebrew spelling KYMAVR and attributes him to the four of disks and the third decan of Capricorn by night.  KYMAVR may allude to "Khem-our" (black light), a form of Horus mentioned in H. P. Blavatsky's Secret Doctrine.  In Sepher Sephiroth, he is listed as KYTzAVR, with a gematria of 327, although KYMAVR=277.

In Harleian Ms. 6482, entitled "The Rosie Crucian Secrets", Thomas Rudd lists Cimeries as the 26th spirit made use of by King Solomon.  He also attributes an angel Cimeriel to one of Dee's Enochian Ensigns of Creation, the tablet of 24 mansions.  The earliest mention of Chamariel is in Rossi's Gnostic tractate.  It is probable that the earliest mention of Kimaris is also Coptic, found in the London oriental mss 6796 where the name "Akathama Chamaris" appears. In this text, the entity in question does not appear to be evil; rather, he is addressed as a godlike helping spirit.

Derivation of the name

Wade Baskin's Dictionary of Satanism speculates that Cimeries is derived from Cimmerians, a warlike people mentioned in the works of several classical authors as dwelling totally in darkness.

See also

The Lesser Key of Solomon
Chimera (mythology)

Sources
S. L. MacGregor Mathers, A. Crowley, The Goetia: The Lesser Key of Solomon the King (1904). 1995 reprint: .

Notes

Goetic demons